Harry Ives Thompson (31 January 1840, West Haven, Connecticut - 1906, West Haven, Connecticut) was an American painter, known primarily for his portraits and rural scenes.

Biography
He was initially trained as a merchant and helped operate the family grocery store; painting in his leisure time. Upon turning twenty-one, in 1861, he decided that he would rather pursue a career in art and took lessons from Benjamin Hutchins  Coe (1799-1883), a landscape painter from Hartford.

Three years later, Coe retired and Thompson took over his drawing school in New Haven until 1867. His first public showing came at the Philadelphia Centennial Exhibition. From 1877 to 1890, he was a regular exhibitor at the National Academy of Design in New York. He also produced numerous portraits of notable people associated with Yale University.

He occasionally painted in New Hampshire as well.

References

External links 

 More works by Thompson @ ArtNet
 Portrait of Jonathan Trumbull, Jr. @ the US House of Representatives
 Thompson (Harry I.) West Haven Genealogical Papers

1840 births
1906 deaths
19th-century American painters
American portrait painters
Painters from Connecticut
20th-century American painters